The 2018 Hart District Council election took place on 3 May 2018 to elect members of Hart District Council in England. This was on the same day as other local elections.

Results 
The election saw the Conservatives gain an independent seat, whilst Community Campaign (Hart) gained a Conservative Seat. As such, whilst the Conservatives and Liberal Democrats had no net change, Community Campaign (Hart) increased their seats by one to nine.

Results by Ward

Blackwater and Hawley

Crookham East

Crookham West and Ewshot

Fleet Central

Fleet East

Fleet West

Hartley Wintney

Hook

Odiham

Yateley East

Yateley West

References

2018 English local elections
Hart District Council elections
2010s in Hampshire